Chaybukha (also Gizhiga or Chaibukha)  is an airport in Magadan Oblast, Russia located 8 km northeast of Chaybukha. It is a major paved airfield with rudimentary taxiways and small parking apron.  It services medium-sized airliners.

References

Airports built in the Soviet Union
Airports in Magadan Oblast